Richard Samuel Hess (born 1954) is an American Old Testament scholar. He is Earl S. Kalland Professor of Old Testament and Semitic Languages at Denver Seminary.

Hess has degrees from Wheaton College, Trinity Evangelical Divinity School, and Hebrew Union College. He previously taught at International Christian College, Glasgow, and the University of Roehampton, London.

Hess is editor of the Denver Journal. He was previously editor of the Bulletin for Biblical Research. He is a member of the New International Version's Committee on Bible Translation.

Works

Thesis

Books

Chapters

References

1954 births
Living people
American biblical scholars
Old Testament scholars
Wheaton College (Illinois) alumni
Trinity Evangelical Divinity School alumni
Hebrew Union College – Jewish Institute of Religion alumni
Academics of the University of Roehampton
Translators of the Bible into English
Academic journal editors